WALW-LP (97.9 FM) is a radio station licensed to serve Moulton, Alabama.  The station is owned by Community Information And Education Radio Inc. It once aired an Americana music format. It currently carries a 1960s-1980s based Classic Hits Format. (Info extracted from their web site)

The station was assigned the WALW-LP call letters by the Federal Communications Commission on December 12, 2002. WALW-LP is the oldest LPFM station in Alabama.

On August 25, 2016, a construction permit was filed to relocate the station from 98.3 FM to 97.9 FM. The station filed a license to cover for the new frequency in early January, 2017, which was issued on January 12, 2017.

References

External links
WALW-LP official website

WALW-LP service area per the FCC database

ALW-LP
ALW-LP
Classic hits radio stations in the United States
Lawrence County, Alabama
Radio stations established in 2004
2004 establishments in Alabama